Fighting Solidarity was a Polish anti-Soviet and anti-communist underground organization, founded in June 1982 by Kornel Morawiecki in Wrocław in response to the de-legalization of Solidarity and government repression of the opposition after martial law was declared in 1981. It was one of the most radical splinters of Solidarity.

Morawiecki and Fighting Solidarity activists saw their organization as the successor to the Polish resistance in World War II, hence their symbol merged the Solidarity logo with the Kotwica and crowned Polish eagle (in 1945, the new communist regime removed the crown from the eagle's head on the Polish coat of arms; many among the opposition saw the crown as a symbol of independent, non-communist Poland).

One of the main activities of Fighting Solidarity was information warfare: it printed and distributed many underground newspapers (bibuła). The most well-known of these included "Biuletyn Dolnośląski" (Wrocław), "Solidarność Walcząca" (Poznań) and "Galicja" (Rzeszów). Fighting Solidarity's bibuła were the first printed during the period of martial law, being available the day after martial law was introduced. Fighting Solidarity also tried to actively infiltrate the Polish secret police (Służba Bezpieczeństwa) and to support other anti-communist organizations, including ones in other countries of the Soviet Bloc, even the Soviet Union itself. The Polish secret police found it extremely hard to infiltrate the organization, even though they employed various tactics, including kidnapping Morawiecki's children in an attempt to blackmail him. Despite its reputation for militancy, Fighting Solidarity did not support violence or terrorism.

Fighting Solidarity was one of two Polish organizations of that time whose primary goals, declared from the start, included the destruction of communism, the independence of Poland and other nations controlled by communist governments (including those comprising the Soviet Union itself), and the reunification of Germany.

Fighting Solidarity power bases included Wrocław, Poznań, Gdańsk, Rzeszów and  Upper Silesia. Among its most prominent members were Maciej Frankiewicz (Poznań), Roman Zwiercan, Andrzej Kołodziej (Gdynia), Jadwiga Chmielowska (Sosnowiec), Janusz Szkutnik (Rzeszów). In 1986 it claimed to have several hundred active members, not counting allies and supporters.

In 1990 many members of Fighting Solidarity founded a political party, the Partia Wolności (Freedom Party).

See also
 Confederation of Independent Poland (Konfederacja Polski Niepodległej)
 Cursed soldiers
 Orange Alternative (Pomarańczowa Alternatywa)

References

External links

 Fighting Solidarity, Institute of National Remembrance 
 Wolni i Solidarni, a portal dedicated to Fighting Solidarity 
 Kornel Morawiecki o swojej organizacji  
 "Solidarność Walcząca" w świetle materiałów Służby Bezpieczeństwa  

Anti-communism in Poland
Anti-communist organizations
Polish dissident organisations
National liberation movements
Solidarity (Polish trade union)